Stenanthemum petraeum is a species of flowering plant in the family Rhamnaceae and is native to inland Western Australia and the Northern Territory. It is a woody, erect shrub with densely hairy young stems, broadly egg-shaped to more or less round leaves, and clusters of white, densely shaggy- to woolly-hairy flowers.

Description
The edges of the leaves curve downwards, the upper surface is glabrous and the lower surface is covered with shaggy silvery hairs.

Taxonomy and naming
Stenanthemum petraeum was first formally described in 1995 by Barbara Lynette Rye in the journal Nuytsia from specimens collected by Alex George near Neale Junction in 1974. The specific epithet (petraeum) means "among rocks", referring to the habitat of this species.

Distribution and habitat
This species of stenanthemum usually grows on stony slopes with Triodia species and is found between Mount Augustus and Laverton in Western Australia and Glen Edith in the Northern Territory.

Conservation status
Stenanthemum petraeum is listed as "not threatened" in Western Australia, by the Government of Western Australia Department of Biodiversity, Conservation and Attractions, but as "near threatened" under the Northern Territory Government Territory Parks and Wildlife Conservation Act.

References

petraeum
Rosales of Australia
Flora of Western Australia
Flora of the Northern Territory
Plants described in 1995
Taxa named by Barbara Lynette Rye